Warren Island may refer to:

 Warren Island (Alaska)
 Warren Island (Antarctica)
 Warren Island State Park in Maine